Bill Woods (born 31 August 1890) is a former  Australian rules footballer who played with Geelong in the Victorian Football League (VFL).

Family
The son of William Woods, a farmer, and Isabella Woods, née Cornell, William Woods was born at Portarlington, Victoria on 31 August 1890.

He married Linda Barbara "Mardi" Allen (1889-1991) on 21 August 1915. They had one child, a daughter.

Military service
He enlisted in the First AIF in 1915, served overseas, sustained a gunshot wound to the head in action in France in 1916, and returned to Australia in 1919.

Death
He died at Heidelberg, Victoria in 1972.

Notes

References
 
 World War One Embarkation Roll: Private William Woods (3654), collection of the Australian War Memorial.
 World War One Nominal Roll: Private William Woods (3654), collection of the Australian War Memorial.
 World War One Service Record: Private William Woods (3654), National Archives of Australia.

External links 
 
 

1890 births
1972 deaths
Australian rules footballers from Victoria (Australia)
Geelong Football Club players
Australian military personnel of World War I